Yohan Congio (born May 12, 1984 in Lunel, France) is a French footballer, who is currently playing for Bergerac Foot.

Career
Congio previously played for FC Sète in Ligue 2 and Championnat National side Calais for two years each. He also played in 4 CFA clubs between 2010/2011 to 2013/2014..

References

1984 births
Living people
French footballers
FC Sète 34 players
Calais RUFC players
Bergerac Périgord FC players
People from Lunel
Association football defenders
US Quevilly-Rouen Métropole players
Rodez AF players
FC Martigues players
Sportspeople from Hérault
Footballers from Occitania (administrative region)